"For Your Love" is a song written and performed by American musician Stevie Wonder, released in February 1995 as the first single from his 22nd album, Conversation Peace (1995). It won two Grammy awards for Best R&B Male Vocal Performance and Best R&B Song at the 38th Grammy Awards.

Critical reception
Dave Sholin from the Gavin Report felt that "the master is still at it. One of his best efforts in a long time should do well at Top 40, urban and A/C." The magazine's Fell and Rufer wrote, "This sounds like the beginning of a Wonder-full year as this is just the tip of a musical iceberg called Conversation Peace".

Music video
The song's accompanying music video was directed by Antoine Fuqua and produced by Propaganda Films in Los Angeles.

Charts

Weekly charts

Year-end charts

References

1995 singles
1995 songs
Stevie Wonder songs
Motown singles
1990s ballads
Songs written by Stevie Wonder
Music videos directed by Antoine Fuqua
Song recordings produced by Stevie Wonder